The 4th White Cloth Hall was a market for the sale of undyed cloth on King Street in Leeds city centre in England. A blue plaque for the building can be found on the nearby Quebec Street.

The 4th White Cloth hall was built in 1868 by the North Eastern Railway company to replace the 3rd White Cloth Hall that they had had to partly demolish in 1865 to build the impressive North Eastern Viaduct to access the New Station.

The building did not last long, due to the decline in cloth manufacturing in Yorkshire. It was never fully used, and was demolished in 1895. Today the site is occupied by the Hotel Metropole. Like the 2nd White Cloth Hall only the cupola survives, incorporated onto the hotel roof.

See also
1st White Cloth Hall
2nd White Cloth Hall
3rd White Cloth Hall

References

Buildings and structures in Leeds
Demolished buildings and structures in England
Buildings and structures demolished in 1895